Bouke Benenga (27 March 1888 in Rotterdam – 4 January 1968 in Rotterdam) was a Dutch freestyle swimmer and water polo player who competed in the 1908 Summer Olympics.

He participated in the 100 metre freestyle competition, but he was eliminated in the first round.

Also he was part of the Dutch water polo team, which finished fourth in the 1908 tournament.

He is the younger brother of Lamme Benenga.

References

External links
Bouke Benenga at Sports-reference.com

1888 births
1968 deaths
Dutch male freestyle swimmers
Olympic swimmers of the Netherlands
Olympic water polo players of the Netherlands
Dutch male water polo players
Swimmers at the 1908 Summer Olympics
Water polo players at the 1908 Summer Olympics
Swimmers from Rotterdam
20th-century Dutch people